Jacob Merrill Manning (December 31, 1824 – November 29, 1882) was a prominent Congregational clergyman, active in Boston, Massachusetts.

Biography 

Manning was born in Greenwood, New York, graduated from Amherst College in 1850, studied theology at Andover Theological Seminary, and in 1854 was ordained as pastor of the Mystic Church in Medford, Massachusetts. In 1857 he became assistant pastor of Old South Church, Boston, where he became pastor in 1872 until he stepped down on March 15, 1882. He served as chaplain to the Massachusetts State Senate in 1858-1859, chaplain to the 43d Massachusetts regiment in 1862-1863. In addition, he was a member of the Boston school board, and overseer of Harvard University from 1860-1866, trustee of the Massachusetts state library from 1865-1882, and lecturer at Andover Theological Seminary from 1866-1872.

He published numerous sermons and addresses, and was a widely popular speaker. Among his best-known lectures was one on Samuel Adams, and among his orations the one that he delivered in May 1861, on the raising of the National flag upon the steeple of the Old South Church, and his eulogy on Henry Wilson at the state-house, Boston, in 1875.

He died in Portland, Maine.

Selected works 
 The Death of Abraham Lincoln, 1865
 Peace under Liberty
 Half Truths and The Truth, 1873
 Helps to a Life of Prayer, 1875

References 

 "Jacob Merrill Manning", in Appletons Encyclopedia, D. Appleton and Company, 1887-1889
 McClintock and Strong Biblical Cyclopedia entry

Religious leaders from Massachusetts
1824 births
1882 deaths
Amherst College alumni
People from Steuben County, New York
Andover Theological Seminary alumni
Boston School Committee members